{{Automatic taxobox
| fossil_range = Lower Callovian
| image = Rhomboteuthis lehmani.png
| image_caption = Rhomboteuthis lehmani specimenLPMP–R.3758 and restoration showing position of ink sac and gladius.
| taxon = Rhomboteuthis
| authority = Fischer & Riou, 1982
| synonyms =
| subdivision_ranks = Species
| subdivision = * Rhomboteuthis lehmani
}}Rhomboteuthis is an extinct species of squid, with Rhomboteuthis lehmani currently being the only described member of the genus. Rhomboteuthis is known from during the Mid-Jurassic of Voulte-sur-Rhône, Ardèche, France.

References
 Fischer, J.-C. & B. Riou 1982. Les teuthoïdes (Cephalopoda, Dibranchiata) du Callovien inférieur de la Voulte-sur-Rhône (Ardèche, France). Annales de Paléontologie 68(4): 295–325.
 Fischer, J.-C. 2003. Invertébrés remarquables du Callovien inférieur de la Voulte-sur-Rhône (Ardèche, France). Annales de Paléontologie'' 89: 223–252.

Jurassic cephalopods
Squid
Fossils of France